Scott Lumley is an American businessman and writer. Lumley is also the former owner of the Music City Stars, previously known as the Nashville Broncs, an expansion team in the American Basketball Association (ABA) that played from 2009 to 2010.

Business endeavors
Lumley started researching liquidation sales and returns. He eventually turned a $250 pallet of products bought from overseas and flipped them into $4800 over several weeks. Lumley founded Resolve Commercial in 2010 and he currently acts as the CEO. Resolve Commercial focuses on developing large residential developments in the Middle Tennessee area.

Legal issues
In 2015, Scott Lumley pleaded guilty to wire fraud and money laundering. Lumley admitted that as the owner of Bluebuyou; a wholesale distributor, he had made misrepresentations to a customer to which he had sold $200,000 of energy drinks. He admitted that he had forged the bills of lading and that the drinks had never been shipped and that the company did not have enough product to satisfy the sale. He was sentenced later that year and agreed to pay full restitution to the customer.

Publications

References

External links
 Official Website

1968 births
Living people
People from Dyersburg, Tennessee
University of Tennessee at Martin alumni
Businesspeople from Tennessee
American sports owners
American businesspeople convicted of crimes